Laurence Michael Foust (June 24, 1928 – October 27, 1984) was an American basketball player who spent 12 seasons in the National Basketball Association (NBA) and was an 8× All-Star.

Career

Foust attended South Catholic High School in Philadelphia, Pennsylvania and was instrumental in winning the city championship against archrival Southern High School by scoring a last second basket.

A  center from La Salle University, Foust was selected by the Chicago Stags in the 1950 NBA Draft, but the Stags franchise folded before the start of the 1950–51 NBA season, and Foust joined the Fort Wayne Pistons.

With the Pistons, Foust averaged a double-double in points and rebounds and was selected to six All-Star games. On November 22, 1950, Foust scored the winning basket in a 19–18 Pistons victory over the Minneapolis Lakers, the lowest scoring game in NBA history.  Foust was tied with Mel Hutchins for the NBA lead in rebounding in the 1951–52 season.  In the 1954–55 season, Foust led the NBA in field goal percentage.

Foust later joined the Lakers in 1957, and he also spent two-and-a-half seasons with the St. Louis Hawks.

Foust retired in 1962 with 11,198 career points and 8,041 career rebounds.

Player profile

Foust utilized his height and strength to stifle his opponents in the paint.  Lead-footed and with clumsy hands, Foust demanded his teammates stay away from the paint and feed him the basketball near the rim.

When author Robert Cohen selected an all-star team from 1946 to 1960 era of the NBA, Foust was chosen the fifth-best center, noting that Foust "[...] in many ways represented one of the finest early prototypes of what eventually became the modernized basketball big man. Although Foust had considerable bulk and displayed a great deal of aggression under the boards, he also exhibited a fair amount of agility and ballhandling skills"  When calculating players of Hall of Fame Probability, Basketball Reference has him listed as 74th with 94.20%, which is the highest among eligible, non-active players that are not currently inducted into the Naismith Basketball Hall of Fame. He is also the only player with eight All-Star Game selections to not be inducted.

NBA career statistics

Regular season

Playoffs

Personal life
He died in 1984 of a heart attack at age 56.

References

External links

1928 births
1984 deaths
American men's basketball players
Basketball players from Ohio
Centers (basketball)
Chicago Stags draft picks
Fort Wayne Pistons players
La Salle Explorers men's basketball players
Minneapolis Lakers players
National Basketball Association All-Stars
People from Painesville, Ohio
Power forwards (basketball)
St. Louis Hawks players
Basketball players from Pittsburgh